Sinasuna Adaren (Smiled Lovingly) is a 2009 Sri Lankan Sinhala romantic drama film directed by Eranga Senaratne and co-produced by Neranjan Keerthiratne and Chandani Keerthiratne for Vidun Cinema Entertainment. It stars Chathurika Peiris, Pradeep Dharmadasa and Buddhika Jayaratne in lead roles along with Dilhani Ekanayake and Rodney Warnakula. Music composed by Priyanjith Wijesekara. It is the 1123rd Sri Lankan film in the Sinhala cinema.

Plot

Cast
 Chathurika Peiris as Vihangi
 Pradeep Dharmadasa as Milan
 Buddhika Jayaratne as Thiwanka
 Dilhani Ekanayake as Mrs. Karandeniya
 Sriyantha Mendis as Bhathiya Karandeniya
 Rodney Warnakula as Lara
 Sanjeewa Mallawarachchi as Subramanium

Songs

References

2009 films
2000s Sinhala-language films
2009 romantic drama films
Sri Lankan romantic drama films